The 164th Regiment (Regional Training Institute) is a training unit of the North Dakota Army National Guard. As the 164th Infantry Regiment, it was formed in the 1920s but traced its history to North Dakota units formed in the 1900s. The regiment was the first United States Army unit to land on Guadalcanal during World War II.

History

World War I and interwar years 
The 164th Infantry Regiment began its history on 8 December 1906 in the North Dakota Army National Guard as Company E, First Infantry Regiment, Williston, North Dakota. It entered federal service on 18 June 1916 for service on the Mexican border. On 14 February 1917, Company E was mustered out of service at Fort Snelling, Minnesota.

Company E was later reorganized on 25 March 1917, and drafted into federal service on 5 August 1917. The company was reorganized and redesignated 4 October 1917 as Company E, 164th Infantry, an element of the 41st Infantry Division. The company was demobilized 28 February 1919 at Camp Dix, New Jersey.

The company was later reorganized and federally recognized 22 January 1921 as Company E, 1st Infantry, Williston, North Dakota. It was reorganized and redesignated 21 October 1921 as Company E, 164th Infantry, an element of the 34th Infantry Division. L. R. Baird attained the rank of brigadier general and commanded the 164th Infantry from 1931 to 1941.

The 164th Infantry, Company G was based out of Glendive, Montana.

World War II 
The 164th Infantry, a unit of the North Dakota National Guard, entered federal service 10 February 1941 at Williston. Before deployment overseas, the 164th was relieved from assignment to the 34th Infantry Division.

Commanded by Colonel Earle Sarles, the 164th transited the South Pacific ferry route in March 1942 to New Caledonia. There they joined the 182nd Infantry Regiment and the 132nd Infantry Regiment, in addition to artillery, engineer and other support units to form a new division on 24 May 1942, designated the Americal Division. The name Americal was derived from a combination of the words America and New Caledonia. The regiment spent nearly five months in combat training. In September, Colonel Sarles, a National Guard officer, was replaced as commander of the regiment by Colonel Bryant E. Moore, a West Point graduate. Moore would subsequently be promoted to command an infantry division in Europe, and the regiment would serve under other commanders, almost all of whom advanced to general's stars.

Arriving at Guadalcanal on 13 October 1942 ahead of its brother regiments as emergency reinforcement for the 1st Marine Division, the Regiment was the first U.S. Army unit to engage in offensive action during World War II in the Battle of Guadalcanal. Between 24 and 27 October, elements of the regiment withstood repeated assaults from Japanese battalions and inflicted some two thousand enemy casualties. The 1st Marine Division commander, Major General Alexander Vandegrift, was so impressed by the soldiers' stand that he issued a unit commendation to the regiment for having demonstrated "an overwhelming superiority over the enemy." In addition, the Marines took the unusual step of awarding Lt. Colonel Robert Hall, commander of the 3rd Battalion, 164th, with the Navy Cross for his role in these battles.

Until the Americal Division commander, Major General Alexander M. Patch, and other units of the division arrived, the 164th fought alongside the Marines in a series of encounters with Japanese units in the Point Cruz area, where they successfully dislodged enemy troops from two hilltop strongpoints. The action earned them the nickname "The 164th Marines."  Members of the 164th were also known as "jungle fighters" within the U.S. media because of the terrain on which they fought.

Later, the 164th participated in extensive jungle patrols as well as organized offensive sweeps of the island to eliminate remaining Japanese resistance. This experience gained the regiment valuable combat experience in jungle travel and navigation, ambush and counter-ambush, and small-unit tactics using small arms and light support weapons. After the Battle of Guadalcanal, the regiment returned to Fiji with the rest of the Americal Division to refit and replenish losses. At this point, many veteran officers and men of the 164th volunteered to join the 5307th Composite Unit, better known as Merrill's Marauders, for service in Burma. With the rest of the Americal, the Regiment later participated in the Bougainville campaign, then fought to secure the islands of Leyte, Cebu, Negros, and Bohol, in the Philippines. The regiment was slated to be part of the invasion of Japan when the war ended in August.

Woodrow W. Keeble, the first Sioux Medal of Honor recipient, served with the 164th throughout the war. He was wounded several times and awarded the Purple Heart and multiple awards for valor during World War II. His Medal of Honor, officially recognized in 2008, came for his actions in the Korean War.

Corporal Kenneth S. Foubert of the 164th Infantry has been recognized as the first U.S. Army soldier to die in combat after the attack on Pearl Harbor.  As he landed on the beach on Guadalcanal, he was struck by shrapnel from a bomb dropped by a Japanese plane.

Inter war service 
The 164th was inactivated 24 November 1945 at Fort Lawton, Washington. On 10 June 1946, the 164th Infantry was relieved from assignment to the Americal Division and assigned to the 47th Infantry Division.

On 1 May 1947, the 164th was reorganized and federally recognized 1 May 1947 as Company E of the 164th Infantry at Williston.

Korean War service
The 164th was ordered to federal service 16 January 1951 at Williston. Company C of the 164th Infantry (NGUS) organized and federally recognized 16 January 1953 at Williston while the 164th Infantry was on federal service.

The 164th was inactivated from active federal Service 2 December 1954 and reverted to state control and redesignated as Company C, 164th Infantry; federal recognition was concurrently withdrawn from Company C, 164th Infantry (NGUS).

Distinctive unit insignia 
 Description
A gold color metal and enamel device  in height overall consisting of a shield blazoned: Azure, a Spanish castle Gules door of the first and fimbriated Or between three six-pointed mullets one and two and debruised in base by a demi-sun issuing from base of the last. Attached below the shield is a blue scroll inscribed "JE SUIS PRET" in gold.
 Symbolism
The service of the former organization, 142d Engineer Battalion, is indicated by the blue shield for Infantry, with the Spanish castle taken from the Spanish Campaign medal representing Spanish War service. The Philippine Insurrection service is indicated by the three mullets from the Philippine Island flag. The sun in base, from the 41st Division shoulder sleeve insignia, denotes World War I service with that division.
 Background
The distinctive unit insignia was originally approved for the 164th Regiment Infantry in 1933. It was redesignated for the 142d Engineer Battalion on 8 May 1956. On 26 December 1974 the insignia was rescinded (cancelled). The insignia was approved for the 164th Regiment, with description and symbolism revised, on 6 November 1997.

Coat of arms

Blazon 
 Shield
Azure, a Spanish castle Gules door of the first and fimbriated Or between three six-pointed mullets one and two and debruised in base by a demi-sun issuing from base of the last.
 Crest
That for the regiments and separate battalions of the North Dakota Army National Guard: From a wreath Or and Azure, a sheaf of three arrows Argent armed and flighted Gules behind a string bow fesswise Or with a grip of the second.
Motto JE SUIS PRET (I Am Ready).

Symbolism 
 Shield
The service of the former organization, 142d Engineer Battalion, is indicated by the blue shield for Infantry, with the Spanish castle taken from the Spanish Campaign medal representing Spanish War service. The Philippine Insurrection service is indicated by the three mullets from the Philippine Island flag. The sun in base, from the 41st Division shoulder sleeve insignia, denotes World War I service with that division.
 Crest
The crest is that of the North Dakota Army National Guard.

Background 
The coat of arms was originally approved for the 164th Regiment Infantry on 11 an 1933. It was redesignated for the 142d Engineer Battalion on 8 May 1956. On 26 December 1974 the coat of arms was rescinded (cancelled). The coat of arms was approved for the 164th Regiment, with description and symbolism revised, on 6 November 1997.

Medal of Honor recipient link
Woodrow Keeble

References

Bibliography 
George, John B. (Lt. Col), Shots Fired in Anger, NRA Press (1981)
Shoptaugh, Terry, They Were Ready: The 164th Infantry in the Pacific War, 164th Infantry Association, 2010.

Further reading

External links 
 164th Infantry web site
 164th Infantry Association Records
 History Highlights – North Dakota National Guard
 Company K of the 164th Infantry Regiment – Dickinson Area Public Library
 164th Infantry Regiment Photographs – Elwyn B. Robinson Department of Special Collections, Chester Fritz Library, University of North Dakota

Training regiments of the United States Army National Guard
Infantry regiments of the United States Army in World War II
Infantry regiments of the United States Army National Guard